Glupovskoye is a rural locality (a village) in Ugolskoye Rural Settlement, Sheksninsky District, Vologda Oblast, Russia. The population was 7 as of 2002.

Geography 
Leonovo is the nearest rural locality.

References 

Rural localities in Sheksninsky District